Ramagiri is a village in Sri Sathya Sai district of the Indian state of Andhra Pradesh. It is the mandal headquarters of Ramagiri mandal in Dharmavaram revenue division.

Geography 
It has an average elevation of 516 metres (1696 ft).

Demographics 
According to Indian census, 2001, the demographic details of Ramagiri mandal is as follows:
 Total Population: 	31,474	in 6,740 Households
 Male Population: 	16,269	and Female Population: 	15,205
 Children Under 6-years of age: 4, 199	(Boys – 2,173 and Girls -	2,026)
 Total Literates: 	15,226

According to Indian Census 2011, the demographics of Ramagiri village are as following:
 Total population – 3778 (among them male population is 1933 and female population is 1845)
Total age group of children between 0–6 years – 369 (among them boys are 189  and girls are 180)

Panchayats 
The following is the list of village panchayats in Ramagiri mandal.
Polepalli, Kuntimaddi, Ganthemarri, Ramagiri, Nasanakota, MotarchinthaPalli, Kondapuram, Peruru, Dubbarlapalli.

References 

Villages in Sri Sathya Sai district
Mandal headquarters in Sri Sathya Sai district